KLKW-LD, virtual and UHF digital channel 22, is a low-powered Estrella TV-affiliated television station licensed to Amarillo, Texas, United States. Owned by HC2 Holdings, it is a sister station of KNKC-LD (channel 29) in Lubbock.

History

Its construction permit dates back to November 7, 2012, though it did not start broadcasting until January 2014. The station's original callsign was K22LK-D, which was changed to the current KLKW-LD on March 11, 2013.

Digital channels
The station's digital signal is multiplexed, as of February 10, 2023, as follows:

Estrella TV programming is broadcast on KLKW's main channel, 22.1. Doctor TV, a healthy lifestyle-oriented television network, was broadcast on KLKW's second subchannel on channel 22.2 until 2015, when it was replaced by Sony Pictures Television's GetTV network. In late 2015, Sonlife Broadcasting Network and Buzzr were added on channels 22.3 and 22.4, respectively. In 2016, Grit was added to digital subchannel 22.5 after ABC affiliate KVII-TV replaced it on 7.3 with Comet. That same year, Escape was added to subchannel 22.6, and GetTV was replaced with Azteca America, bringing the network back to the Amarillo market since former Azteca America affiliate KTXD-LP ceased operations in 2009. On January 1, 2023, Azteca ceased operations, leaving channel 22.2 blank.

References

External links
Query the FCC’s TV station database for KLKW
Search KLKW-LD on RECNet
DTV America
Doctor TV website
KLKW-LD AMARILLO, TX at RabbitEars.Info

Low-power television stations in the United States
Estrella TV affiliates
GetTV affiliates
Buzzr affiliates
LKW-LD
Innovate Corp.